The Freeport station is a station on the Babylon Branch of the Long Island Rail Road. It is located in Freeport Plaza between Henry Street and Benson Place, just north of NY 27 in Freeport, New York.

History 
The Freeport station was originally built on October 28, 1867 by the South Side Railroad of Long Island, and was rebuilt in 1899. It is among many of the stations along the Babylon Branch that were elevated throughout Nassau and Western Suffolk counties during the 1960s, in this case October 1960.

Some afternoon rush-hour trains terminate at Freeport; and some morning rush-hour trains originate at Freeport.

The station is served by several different Nassau Inter-County Express routes, including service to Jones Beach.

Station layout
The station has one 12-car-long high-level island platform between the two tracks. There are two layover tracks east of the station.

Image gallery

References

External links

March 2000 Photo (Unofficial LIRR Photo)
 PORT Interlocking (The LIRR Today)
 Main Street entrance from Google Maps Street View

Long Island Rail Road stations in Nassau County, New York
Freeport, New York
Railway stations in the United States opened in 1867